Dąbroszyn  is a village in the administrative district of Gmina Witnica, within Gorzów County, Lubusz Voivodeship, in western Poland.

The village has a population of 820.

Notable residents

 Hans Adam von Schöning (1641–1696), Prussian and Saxon Generalfeldmarschall
 Luise Eleonore Wreech (1708–1784), Prussian noblewoman

References

Villages in Gorzów County